Legislative elections were held in El Salvador on 12 March 1978. The elections were boycotted by all but one of the opposition parties, resulting in an easy victory for the ruling National Conciliation Party, which won 50 of the 54 seats.

Results

References

Bibliography
Political Handbook of the world, 1978. New York, 1979. 
Anderson, Thomas P. 1988. Politics in Central America: Guatemala, El Salvador, Honduras, and Nicaragua. New York: Praeger. Revised edition.
Herman, Edward S. and Frank Brodhead. 1984. Demonstration elections: U.S.-staged elections in the Dominican Republic, Vietnam, and El Salvador. Boston: South End Press.
Montgomery, Tommie Sue. 1995. Revolution in El Salvador: from civil strife to civil peace. Boulder: Westview.
Webre, Stephen. 1979. José Napoleón Duarte and the Christian Democratic Party in Salvadoran Politics 1960-1972. Baton Rouge: Louisiana State University Press.

Legislative elections in El Salvador
1978 in El Salvador
El Salvador
Election and referendum articles with incomplete results